SRC may refer to:

Education
 Sid Richardson College, residential college of Rice University campus, Houston, Texas, USA
 Southern Regional College, a higher education college in Northern Ireland
 Spoon River College, a community college in Illinois, USA
 Students' representative council, of an  institution
 Sulaiman Al Rajhi Colleges, a university in Al Bukayriyah, Saudi Arabia

Music
 SRC (band), a rock band from the late 1960s
 SRC (album), the 1968 album by SRC
 SRC Records, an American record label
 Snake River Conspiracy, an American industrial rock band
 Suria Records or SRC, a Malaysian record label.

Science and technology
 DEC Systems Research Center, the former research laboratory of Digital Equipment Corporation
 Sample rate conversion, a technique used in converting between different formats of digitized analog data
 Saskatchewan Research Council, a technology corporation
 Spring Research Conference, an annual conference sponsored by the American Statistical Association (ASA) Section on Physical and Engineering Sciences (SPES) and the Institute of Mathematical Statistics (IMS).
 Science Research Council, earlier name of the Science and Engineering Research Council, a former British government agency
 Semiconductor Research Corporation, an American non-profit research consortium
 Set redundancy compression, compression methods for similar images
 Short rotation coppice, an energy crop
 Src (gene), a family of proto-oncogenic tyrosine kinases
 SRC, the human orthologue of the Src gene
 SRC Computers, a company founded by Seymour Cray
 SRC Inc. (formerly Syracuse Research Corporation), a not-for-profit research company based in Syracuse, New York
 Stockholm Resilience Centre (SRC), a research centre on resilience and sustainability science
 Synchrotron Radiation Center, a former physics laboratory of the University of Wisconsin–Madison
Software Release Criteria, Release criteria are objective measurements of the critical attributes of the product or project. Listing and referring to the criteria allow you to know whether the product is ready to release.

Transport
 Santragachi Junction railway station (station code SRC), Santragachhi, Howrah, India
 Streatham Common railway station (National Rail station code SRC), London, England

Other
 Scottish Rally Championship, a motorsport series in Scotland
 Sengoku Raiden Championship, a mixed martial arts competition series
 Short Range Certificate, internationally valid certificate issued to marine VHF radio station operators
 Singapore Red Cross Society, the Red Cross society for Singapore
 Société Radio-Canada, French name for the Canadian Broadcasting Corporation
 Space Research Corporation, founded by Gerald Bull
 Speedrun.com, a website about speedrunning